N-acetyltransferase 1 (arylamine N-acetyltransferase) is a protein that in humans is encoded by the NAT1 gene.

This gene is one of two arylamine N-acetyltransferase (NAT) genes in the human genome, and is orthologous to the mouse and rat NAT2 genes. The enzyme encoded by this gene catalyzes the transfer of an acetyl group from acetyl-CoA to various arylamine and hydrazine substrates. This enzyme helps metabolize drugs and other xenobiotics, and functions in folate catabolism. Multiple transcript variants encoding different isoforms have been found for this gene. [provided by RefSeq, Aug 2011].

References

Further reading